The whip-fin wrasse (Cirrhilabrus filamentosus) is a species of wrasse endemic to Indonesia, where it is only known from the waters of the Java Sea. It can reach  in total length. Both its common name and its specific name refer to the long filament extending from the tenth and eleventh rays of the dorsal fin.

References

External links
 

Whipfin wrasse
Taxa named by Wolfgang Klausewitz
Fish described in 1976